The 1966 Pau Grand Prix was a Formula Two motor race held on 17 April 1966 at the Pau circuit, in Pau, Pyrénées-Atlantiques, France. The Grand Prix was won by Jack Brabham, driving the Brabham BT18. Denny Hulme finished second and Graham Hill third.

Classification

Race

References

Pau Grand Prix
1966 in French motorsport